The Complete Collection is a six-CD box set by British recording artist Lisa Stansfield. It was released by Arista Records in the United Kingdom on 2 June 2003 and includes five of Stansfield's studio albums with bonus tracks and a sixth disc with remixes, rarities and one previously unreleased song. The Complete Collection garnered favorable reviews from music critics. In 2014, more expanded The Collection 1989–2003 was also released.

Background
After releasing Biography: The Greatest Hits on 3 February 2003, Stansfield fulfilled her deal with Arista Records and left the label. Arista Records remastered all of her studio albums and re-released them separately with bonus tracks on 2 June 2003. At the same time, they issued The Complete Collection which includes all the remastered studio albums with bonus tracks and an additional disc, Live/Rare/Mixed.

Content
Digitally remastered limited edition white and silver embossed box set includes all of Stanfield's studio albums released through 2003. Each album comes in a digipak with the original artwork, new sleeve notes, new photos and bonus tracks on each disc. In addition to the regular studio albums, this set also includes a special Live/Rare/Mixed disc with single B-sides, live tracks, remixes and previously unreleased track. Stansfield's very first band, Blue Zone, with husband Ian Devaney and school mate Andy Morris is represented on Live/Rare/Mixed by "There Was I", "Dirty Talk" and the previously unreleased "The Answer" (recorded in 1986). The very rare B-sides "Sing It" and "Big Thing", and live recordings of "Tenderly" and medley "Live Together/Young Hearts Run Free" (both performed in a concert held at Wembley in 1992) are included as well as three club remixes. Bonus songs on the studio albums include: "People Hold On" (Single Mix), "My Apple Heart", "Lay Me Down", "Something's Happenin'", "When You're Gone", "Everything Will Get Better", "Change" (Frankie Knuckles Remix), "Gonna Try It Anyway", "Dream Away" (Duet with Babyface), "So Natural" (No Presevatives Mix by Roger Sanchez), "Breathtaking", "Baby Come Back", "All over Me", "Can't Wait To" and "You Get Me".

Critical reception

The Complete Collection received positive reviews from music critics. According to Johnny Loftus from AllMusic, it is "definitely the most comprehensive Stansfield retrospective; it borders on overkill." He praised the Massive Attack version of "Live Together" on Live/Rare/Mixed. Tim Sendra, also from AllMusic focused on Live/Rare/Mixed and wrote that this disc "is exactly what it says it is: a collection of live tracks, B-sides, and an unreleased track ('The Answer'). The live tracks 'Tenderly' and the medley of 'Live Together/Young Hearts Run Free' are taken from a 1992 show at Wembley. The mixes are by Massive Attack, Driza Bone, and The Dirty Rotten Scoundrels and do a nice job of funking up Stansfield's often reserved style. The rest of the disc is made up of B-sides." Sendra called it "a nice collection for Stansfield fanatics". Alex Bettucchi also wrote a positive review and noted that the only flaw is the fact that The Complete Collection does not include any songs from Big Thing (1988) or Swing (1999).

Track listing

Release history

References

2003 greatest hits albums
Reissue albums
Lisa Stansfield compilation albums
Disco compilation albums
Pop rock compilation albums